Transportation in Lycoming County, Pennsylvania has a long and varied history. The area was settled in the mid 1700s. Transportation was mostly using the Susquehanna River and railroad as Williamsport was a travel hub or center for Central Pennsylvania.

Modern transportation includes aviation, infrastructure such as roadways, bridges and highways.

Transportation demographics 

In an online poll done by the Williamsport Sun Gazette a majority (approx. 73%) of residents in Lycoming County 25 years of age and up get to work in a vehicle. 13% uses public transportation, 9% walk or bike to work and 5% other modes of transportation.

79% of 500 Lycoming county residents interviewed said that they have used public transportation at least once, and 73% of riders say they are happy with service. "Service" includes, fair prices, time and bus interior condition (trash on floor, broken seats etc.)

Transportation infrastructure

Bridges 
 Carl E. Stotz Memorial Little League Bridge formerly Market Street Bridge
 Maynard Street Bridge
 Arch Street Bridge
 Broad Street Bridge; also known as The Green Bridge
 Loyalsock Creek Railroad Bridge
 Multiple Bridges for Interstate 180 and US 15

Roadways 
Over 3,500 miles of roadways throughout the county.

Railroads

History

Vast stands of timber and nearby coal deposits brought three early railroads to the Williamsport and Lycoming County area. After drifting logs down the West Branch Susquehanna River became impractical. Transporting logs and other goods by rail was faster and more business-friendly. After the logging boom from 1880 to 1930 the area railroads were used for passenger lines connecting Williamsport to Philadelphia, State College, Pittsburgh, Allentown and the Wilkes Barre-Scranton area.

The areas rail lines schedule has decreased in the past 25 years. As of 2011 <10 daily train movements in Lycoming County (excl. inter-county rail operations accounts for <5 daily rail movement).

Highways

Current highways
Highways in Lycoming County include Pennsylvania State Routes: 14, 42, 44, 87, 184, 284, 287, 405, 442, 554, 654, 864, 880, 973. U.S. Routes: 15 and 220. Also Interstate I-180.

Major roadways 
The following are major roadways in Lycoming County:
 Broad Street; Montoursville
 East Third Street; Williamsport and Loyalsock Township
 Market Street; Williamsport
 South Market Street; South Williamsport
 Haststings Street; South Williamsport
 Four Mile Dr.; Loyalsock Township
 Northway Road; Loyalsock Township
 West Southern Ave; South Williamsport

Airports

There is one airport in Lycoming. Williamsport Regional Airport is a fully operational public airport with daily commercial flights. The airport serves Williamsport, Pennsylvania and the surrounding Lycoming County area and serves about 25,000 annual passengers. The airport is located five miles east of Williamsport, in Lycoming County, Pennsylvania. It is owned by the Williamsport Municipal Airport Authority.

Passenger numbers

Growth and continued expansion

Airport 

Williamsport Regional Airport received a $19 million expansion budget paid for by the Williamsport Municipal Airport Authority, local, state and federal governments to replace the old terminal and air-side improvements.

Other improvements other that the terminal include. Upgrades to the instrument landing system and runway safety area. Construction of a parallel taxiway, re-marking of the airfield to adhere to FAA directives. Construction of new taxiway “C” to the terminal ramp and upgrades to the airfield taxiways lighting system.

Roadways 
Williamsport and county authorities along with PennDOT created a master plan through the year 2025. Which includes up-keep, construction and re-construction of area, highways and roadways.

Public transit 
In 2015 the River Valley Transit Corp. introduce the new Trade and Transit II and upgrades to its bus terminal in downtown Williamsport. Also additions to bus routes and new natural gas busses with a cleaner burn. Which then produces reduced prices for riders.

References